Elias Brown (May 9, 1793 – July 3, 1857) was a U.S. Representative from Maryland.

Born near Baltimore, Maryland, Brown attended the common schools.  He served as presidential elector on the ticket of James Monroe and Daniel D. Tompkins in 1820 and on the ticket of John Quincy Adams and Richard Rush in 1828.

Brown was elected as a Jacksonian to the Twenty-first Congress, where he served from March 4, 1829 to March 3, 1831.  He also served as member of the Maryland House of Delegates in 1834 and 1835, and as member of the Maryland Senate from 1836 to 1838.  In 1836, he served as presidential elector on the ticket of William Henry Harrison and John Tyler, and served as delegate to the State constitutional convention the same year.  He died near Baltimore, Maryland, and is interred in a private cemetery near Eldersburg, Maryland.

References

1793 births
1857 deaths
Members of the Maryland House of Delegates
Maryland state senators
1820 United States presidential electors
1828 United States presidential electors
Politicians from Baltimore
Maryland Whigs
Jacksonian members of the United States House of Representatives from Maryland
19th-century American politicians